Bodil Nyboe Andersen (born 1940) is a Danish economist who was the governor of the National Bank of Denmark from 1995 to 2005. She previously taught at the University of Copenhagen's Department of Economics and in 1981 served on the board of directors of Andelsbanken (later Unibank), where she became director. Nyboe Andersen was Denmark's first female bank director and the world's first female central bank governor.

Early life and education
Born on 9 October 1940 in the Frederiksberg district of Copenhagen, Bodil Nyboe Andersen was the daughter of the economist and politician Poul Frode Nyboe Andersen (1913–2004) and the teacher Edith (Ditte) Valborg Asmand Raben (1913–1993). After matriculating from Rungsted State School in 1959, she was one of just three women to study political science at the University of Copenhagen, graduating with flying colours in 1966.

Career
Her first appointment was in the economic secretariat of the Ministry of Economic Affairs but when her father became minister in 1968, she moved to the economics department at the University of Copenhagen where she served as a member of the board. In 1981, she relieved her father of his position as director of Andelsbanken. Together with her colleague A.C. Jacobsen, she contributed to the bank's modernization and efficiency. In parallel, she served on the boards of the Danish Bankers Association (Bankforeningen) (1985–1990), Payment Business Service (Pengeinstitutternes Betalings Service) (1988–1990) and the Great Belt Fixed Link (Storebæltsforbindelsen) (1987–1991). Following Andelbanken's merger in 1990, she served on the board of Unidanmark and Unibank.

Also in 1990, she moved to the National Bank, replacing  as governor in 1995. In this position, she exhibited a high degree of the logic and clarity she had acquired as an academic.

Awards
In connection with her retirement as governor of the National Bank, in 2006 Nyboe Andersen was honoured with the Grand Cross of the Order of the Dannebrog, an exceptionally high honour.

In 1989, she was named Årets erhvervskvinde (Danish Businesswoman of the Year).

References

1940 births
Living people
People from Frederiksberg
Danish economists
Danish women economists
Danish bankers
Women bankers
Governors of the Bank of Denmark
Grand Crosses of the Order of the Dannebrog